Miradouro da Serreta is a monument in the Azores. It is located in the municipality of Angra do Heroísmo, on the island of Terceira.

Due to the site's height, it offers a wide view of the island of São Jorge.

It is located on a lava flow that originated during the 1761 eruption of the Serra de Santa Bárbara volcano.

Angra do Heroísmo